The men's 4 × 400 metres relay event at the 1932 Summer Olympics took place on August 6 and August 7 at the Los Angeles Memorial Coliseum.

Results

Heats
Two heats were held; the fastest three times advanced to the final round.

Heat one

Heat Two

Final

Key: WR = world record

References

Athletics at the 1932 Summer Olympics
Relay foot races at the Olympics
Men's events at the 1932 Summer Olympics